Ferdinand Franz Engelbert Dorsch (10 December 1875,  Pécs - 9 January 1938, Dresden) was a German painter, graphic artist, and art Professor.

Life and work 
While he was still very young, his family moved to Vienna, where he grew up. In 1891, thanks to a scholarship from the Principality of Reuss-Gera, he was able to study at the Dresden Academy of Fine Arts with  Leon Pohle and Ferdinand Pauwels. From 1895 to 1898, he worked with Gotthardt Kuehl, who became a lifelong friend and patron.

He returned to Vienna in 1898, where he made the acquaintance of Carl Moll, a member of the Vienna Secession, who prompted him to join. In addition to painting portraits, he supported himself by doing photo retouching. By 1901, he was back in Dresden. The following year, he joined "", an artists' cooperative founded by his friend, Kuehl. During this time, he took several painting trips with Kuehl, and was inspired to become an Impressionist.

Due to a lack of commissions, beginning in 1904, he operated his own painting school. His students included  and Conrad Felixmüller. He was named a Professor at the Dresden Academy in 1914, but continued to operate his school until 1916, when the workload became too great. His best known students there included Otto Dix, and Paul Sinkwitz. In 1926/27 and again from 1935, he served as Rector.

That same year, he was awarded a Knight's Cross in the Albert Order. He and Max Feldbauer jointly operated a studio from 1922. A special exhibition of his works was held in Berlin in 1935. No catalogue raisonné of his works has been compiled. They may be seen at the National Gallery (Berlin), the Galerie Neue Meister and the Städtische Galerie in Dresden, and the Museum der bildenden Künste in Leipzig, among many others.

Selected paintings

Sources 
 "Dorsch, Ferdinand", In: Hans Vollmer (Ed.): Allgemeines Lexikon der bildenden Künstler des XX. Jahrhunderts, Vol.1: A–D. E. A. Seemann, Leipzig 1953, pg.587
 Ferdinand Dorsch 1875–1938. Ein Künstlerleben in Dresden, exhibition catalog, with contributions by Georg Siebert, Conrad Felixmüller et al., Galerie von Abercron, Cologne 1976 (Entry at the Deutsche National Bibliothek)
 Dieter Hoffmann (Ed.): Dresden, ein Traum. Lithographien und Zeichnungen von Ferdinand Dorsch, Hellerau-Verlag, Dresden 1993.

External links 

 More works by Dorsch @ ArtNet
 Biography of Dorsch @ the Galerie von Abercron

1875 births
1938 deaths
19th-century German painters
19th-century German male artists
German genre painters
Dresden Academy of Fine Arts
People from Pécs
20th-century German painters
20th-century German male artists